Doctor Faustus is a 1967 British horror film adaptation of the 1588 Christopher Marlowe play The Tragical History of Doctor Faustus directed by Richard Burton and Nevill Coghill. The first theatrical film version of a Marlowe play, it was the only film directed by Burton or Coghill, Burton's Oxford University mentor. It starred Burton as the title character Faustus. Elizabeth Taylor made a silent cameo appearance as Helen of Troy. The film is a permanent record of a stage production that Burton starred in and staged with Coghill at the Oxford University Dramatic Society in 1966. Burton would not appear on stage again until he took over the role of Martin Dysart in Equus on Broadway ten years later.

Plot
University of Wittenberg scholar Faustus earns his doctorate, but his insatiable craving for knowledge and power leads Faustus to try his hand at necromancy in an attempt to conjure Mephistopheles out of hell. Faustus bargains his soul to Lucifer in exchange for 24 living years where Mephistopheles is his slave. Signing the pact in his own blood, Mephistopheles proceeds to reveal to Faustus the works and doings of the Devil.

Cast
 Richard Burton as Doctor Faustus
 Elizabeth Taylor as Helen of Troy
Of the Oxford University Dramatic Society, Queen's College, Oxford, England:
 Andreas Teuber as Mephistopheles
 Ram Chopra as Valdes
 Richard Carwardine as Cornelius
 Patrick Barwise as Wagner
 Michael Meneaugh as Good Angel / Bishop
 Richard Durden as Evil Angel / Knight (credited as Richard Durden-Smith)
 David McIntosh as Lucifer
 Jeremy Eccles as Beelzebub
 Gwydion Thomas as Lechery
 Ian Marter as Pride / Emperor
 Nicholas Loukes as Envy / Cardinal of Lorraine
 Adrian Benjamin as Pope
 Elizabeth O'Donovan as Empress

With:
 Ambrose Coghill as Avarice
 Maria Aitken as Sloth (uncredited)
 Hugh Williams as Scholar

Reception
Reviews of the staged version in the British press were "less than enthusiastic", with critics commenting "a sad example of university drama at its worst", with an uninspired Burton "walking through the part". Taylor was "undeniably decorative, but there was nothing much to say about her acting ability". The movie received a terribly negative review in The New York Times, Renata Adler criticizing the adaptation of the text ("the play has been quite badly cut"), Burton's performance ("he seems happiest shouting in Latin, or in Ms. Taylor's ear"), the score ("some horrible electronic Wagnerian theme music"), and Taylor's role ("in this last role [Alexander's paramour], she is, for some reason, frosted all over with silver—like a pastry, or a devaluated refugee from Goldfinger"), reserving praise only for Teuber's performance ("one fine, very pious performance").

References

External links
 
 
 

1967 films
1967 horror films
British horror films
British mystery films
Latin-language films
Films directed by Richard Burton
Adaptations of works by Christopher Marlowe
Films scored by Mario Nascimbene
British films based on plays
Films shot in Rome
Works based on the Faust legend
Columbia Pictures films
1960s fantasy films
Films set in the 16th century
Films set in the Holy Roman Empire
Filmed stage productions
1960s English-language films
1960s British films